Megascolides is a genus of earthworms in the family Megascolecidae.

Species
There are about 40 species:

References

Further reading
 Giant Gippsland earthworm at the Museum Victoria website
 Rossiter, RJ; Gaffney, TJ; Rosenberg, H; Ennor, AH (1960). "The formation in vivo of lombricine in the earthworm (Megascolides cameroni)". The Biochemical Journal. 76 (3): 603–10. . . .

Megascolecidae
Annelid genera
Taxa named by Frederick McCoy